Nephroscopy is an endoscopic examination of the kidney.

It was first performed percutaneously in 1941.

References

Urologic procedures
Endoscopy